The New Zealand national football team represented New Zealand at the FIFA Confederations Cup on four occasions, in 1999, 2003, 2009 and 2017.

Record at the FIFA Confederations Cup

1999 FIFA Confederations Cup

Group B

2003 FIFA Confederations Cup

Group A

2009 FIFA Confederations Cup

Group A

2017 FIFA Confederations Cup

Group stage

Goalscorers

References

New Zealand national football team
Countries at the FIFA Confederations Cup